Fareeha Fatima (born 17 April 1971) is a Pakistani politician who was a Member of the Provincial Assembly of the Punjab, from October 2015 to May 2018.

Early life and education
She was born on 17 April 1971 in Faisalabad.

She has completed matriculation level education.

Political career
She was elected to the Provincial Assembly of the Punjab as a candidate of Pakistan Muslim League (N) (PML-N) on a reserved seat for women in October 2015.

References

Living people
Punjab MPAs 2013–2018
1971 births
Pakistan Muslim League (N) politicians
Women members of the Provincial Assembly of the Punjab
21st-century Pakistani women politicians